|}

The National Spirit Hurdle is a Grade 2 National Hunt hurdle race in Great Britain which is open to horses aged four years or older. It is run at Fontwell Park over a distance of about 2 miles and 3 furlongs (2 miles, 3 furlongs and 33 yards or ), and during its running there are ten hurdles to be jumped. The race is scheduled to take place each year in late February or early March.

The event is named after National Spirit, a dual winner of the Champion Hurdle in the 1940s. National Spirit won five times at Fontwell Park, including three successive victories in the Rank Challenge Cup. The National Spirit Hurdle was established in 1965, and the inaugural running was won by Salmon Spray. During its early years it was also won by Comedy of Errors.

For a period the race was run over 2¼ miles, and it served as a trial for the Champion Hurdle (Beech Road won both events in 1989). It was discontinued in 1994, but its title was revived for a handicap race which took place annually from 1996 to 1998. It was relaunched as a conditions race over 2 miles and 2½ furlongs in 1999, and it was extended to its present length in 2004.

The National Spirit Hurdle is now regarded as a trial for the Stayers' Hurdle. The only horse to have won both races in the same year was My Way de Solzen in 2006. Another horse to have achieved victory in both events, albeit in different seasons, was Baracouda.

Winners since 1971

See also
 Horseracing in Great Britain
 List of British National Hunt races

References
 Racing Post:

 fontwellpark.co.uk – History of Fontwell Park Racecourse.
 pedigreequery.com – National Spirit Hurdle – Fontwell.

National Hunt races in Great Britain
Fontwell Park Racecourse
National Hunt hurdle races